Cornwallis Park is a rural community in Annapolis County, Nova Scotia, Canada. As of the 2021 census, the population was 488, an increase of 1.9% from 2016.

History 
The community is located on the western edge of Clementsport and immediately east of Deep Brook. After CFB Cornwallis closed in 1994 the property was converted to civilian use. A local development authority used the name Cornwallis Park and this name was formally adopted for the community in 2000.

Demographics 

Current developments 
Cornwallis Park was home to the Pearson Peacekeeping Centre's main administrative office, located in the former base commanders residence. A significant portion of the former military base's facilities (particularly housing, hospitality, meeting rooms and assembly halls) have been taken over by the Annapolis Basin Conference Centre. Cornwallis Park hosts over 1000 Royal Canadian Sea Cadets annually for training through CSTC HMCS Acadia. Many of the married quarters (PMQs) have been sold for private residences.

Notable residents

References

External links
 Cornwallis Nova Scotia
 Cornwallis Park on nsplacenames.ca

Communities in Annapolis County, Nova Scotia
Designated places in Nova Scotia